The 2012 Seguros Bolívar Open Pereira was a professional tennis tournament played on clay courts. It was the fourth edition of the tournament which was part of the 2012 ATP Challenger Tour. It took place in Pereira, Colombia between 9 and 15 April 2012.

Singles main draw entrants

Seeds

 1 Rankings are as of April 2, 2012.

Other entrants
The following players received wildcards into the singles main draw:
  Felipe Escobar
  Alejandro Falla
  Nicolás Massú
  Sebastian Serrano

The following players received entry from the qualifying draw:
  Nicolás Barrientos
  Júlio César Campozano
  Michael Quintero
  Goran Tošić

Champions

Singles

 Carlos Salamanca def.  Rubén Ramírez Hidalgo, 5–7, 6–2, 6–1

Doubles

 Martín Alund /  Guido Pella def.  Sebastián Decoud /  Rubén Ramírez Hidalgo, 6–3, 2–6, [10–5]

External links
Official Website
ITF Search
ATP official site

Seguros Bolivar Open Pereira
Seguros Bolívar Open Pereira
2012 in Colombian tennis